During the 2006–07 English football season, Southampton Football Club competed in the Football League Championship.

Southampton improved in their second consecutive season in the Championship, although their overall form was inconsistent and they were soon out of the race for automatic promotion. Their inconsistency threatened to put them out of the play-off picture too, but eventually Southampton scraped to sixth position in the final table. Southampton were drawn against manager George Burley's old club Derby County, who managed to defeat Southampton 4–3 in a penalty shootout after a 4–4 aggregate draw over two legs.

Final League table (extract)

Championship
Note: Southampton score given first

Legend

Championship play-off semi-final

FA Cup

League Cup

Kit
The season's kit was manufactured by the club's own brand, Saints; a new kit was introduced for the season. The kit was sponsored by English airline Flybe.

Squad statistics
Source:

Numbers in parentheses denote appearances as substitute.
Players with squad numbers struck through and marked  left the club during the playing season.
Players with names in italics and marked * were on loan from another club for the whole of their season with Southampton.
Players listed with no appearances have been in the matchday squad but only as unused substitutes.
Key to positions: GK – Goalkeeper; DF – Defender; MF – Midfielder; FW – Forward

References

External links
Southampton Football Club match record: 2006–07

Southampton F.C. seasons
Southampton